Gluaiseacht for Global Justice is an Irish environmental, peace and social justice group. Gluaiseacht means "movement" in the Irish language.  The group believes in non-violent resistance to the current form of capitalist globalisation. It was originally a network of Ecological and One World Societies at universities and colleges throughout Ireland. It is a member of the Irish Environmental Network.

Gluaiseacht has been involved in anti-nuclear protests at the Trident submarine base in Faslane, Scotland, and the Sellafield nuclear plant.

Gluaiseacht organised the 2002 Ecotopia gathering (an annual summer camp for activists in Europe) in association with European Youth For Action.

See also 
	
 Conservation movement
 Environmentalism

References

External links
 Gluaiseacht for Global Justice, Official site

Environmental organisations based in Ireland
Anti–nuclear weapons movement
All-Ireland organisations